Clepsis devexa is a species of moth from the family Tortricidae. It is found in Colombia and Ecuador (Tungurahua Province, Carchi Province).

References

Moths described in 1926
Clepsis